Michael Steven McGreevy (born July 8, 2000) is an American professional baseball pitcher in the St. Louis Cardinals organization.

Amateur career
McGreevy grew up in San Clemente, California and attended San Clemente High School. In 2018, his senior year, he pitched to a 2.20 ERA.

Undrafted out of high school, McGreevy enrolled at UC Santa Barbara where he pitched in 29 games as a reliever during his freshman season, posting a 5-1 record with six saves and was named first team All-Big West Conference and a freshman All-American by Baseball America. As a sophomore, he went 2-0 with a 0.99 ERA in four starts before the season was cut short due to the coronavirus pandemic. During his junior season, McGreevy became a first round prospect for the upcoming Major League Baseball draft. He finished his junior season with a 9-2 record, a 2.92 ERA and 115 strikeouts against 11 walks over  innings.

Professional career
McGreevy was selected by the St. Louis Cardinals in the first round with the 18th overall selection in the 2021 Major League Baseball draft. He signed with the Cardinals on July 16, 2021 for a $2.75 million bonus. McGreevy was assigned to the Rookie-level Florida Complex League Cardinals to start his professional career. After two games, he was promoted to the Palm Beach Cardinals of the Low-A Southeast. He pitched six innings with Palm Beach, giving up six runs and ten hits over six innings.

McGreevy was assigned to the Peoria Chiefs of the High-A Midwest League to begin the 2022 season. After eight starts in which he went 3-1 with a 2.58 ERA over  innings, he was promoted to the Springfield Cardinals of the Double-A Texas League.

References

External links

UCSB Gauchos bio

Living people
Baseball players from California
Baseball pitchers
UC Santa Barbara Gauchos baseball players
2000 births
Florida Complex League Cardinals players
Palm Beach Cardinals players
Peoria Chiefs players
Springfield Cardinals players